Clematicissus angustissima is a vine in the Vitaceae family, endemic to the Geraldton area of Western Australia.

The species was first described as Vitis angustissima in 1859 by Ferdinand von Mueller, from a specimen collected by Oldfield on the Murchison River. In 1887 Jules Planchon reassigned it to his newly described genus, Clematicissus, with Clematicussus angustissima being the type species.

Description 
C. angustissima is a deciduous vine growing from numerous tubers. The tendrils are leaf-opposed and the five-palmate (3-7) leaves can be entire or deeply indented. The inflorescence is leaf-opposed and multi-flowered with congested heads. Both calyx and corolla are five-lobed. The berries are fleshy and purplish-black to black when mature.

Habitat
It is found in woodlands, generally on sand or loam.

References

Vines
Vitaceae
Plants described in 1859
Taxa named by Ferdinand von Mueller
Flora of Western Australia